Royal Air Force Beaulieu or more simply RAF Beaulieu is a former Royal Air Force station in the New Forest, Hampshire, England. It was also known as Beaulieu airfield, Beaulieu aerodrome and USAAF Station AAF 408.

During the First World War there was a Royal Flying Corps training airfield, RFC Beaulieu, at East Boldre that was closed in 1919; the new RAF Beaulieu was built on the opposite side of the road.[]

Opened on Saturday 8 August 1942, it was used by both the Royal Air Force and then later United States Army Air Forces. During the war it was used as a bomber and fighter airfield. After the war, it was used for experimental work before it was closed in 1959.

Today the remains of the airfield are on heathland managed by the Forestry Commission. Areas of the old airfield are now designated as a flying area for model aircraft.

History

Royal Air Force use

The airfield was also used by the following units:

USAAF use
Beaulieu was known as USAAF Station AAF 408 for security reasons by the USAAF during the war, and by which it was referred to instead of location. Its Pundit Code was "BL".

365th Fighter Group

From 1 March 1944 Beaulieu airfield was made available for USAAF Ninth Air Force use. With the imminent arrival of more bomber groups in Essex the 365th Fighter Group was transferred from RAF Gosfield on the 5 and 6 March 1944.

The 365th was a Republic P-47 Thunderbolt group, with the following operational squadrons:

 386th Fighter Squadron (D5)
 387th Fighter Squadron (B4)
 388th Fighter Squadron (C4)

The 365th was a group of Ninth Air Force's 84th Fighter Wing, IX Tactical Air Command. The 365th Group began its move to Europe on 21 June 1944, the first squadron taking up residence at a temporary airfield Advanced Landing Ground A-7 Azeville, France on 26 June.

323rd Bombardment Group

Between 1 and 21 July the Martin B-26 Marauders of the 323rd Bombardment Group arrived from RAF Earls Colne. The group was assigned to the 3d Bombardment Wing with a Horizontal white tail band for its group marking. Operational squadrons of the 323d were:

 453d Bombardment Squadron (VT)
 454th Bombardment Squadron (RJ)
 455th Bombardment Squadron (YU)
 456th Bombardment Squadron (WT)
 
Between the 16 and 26 of August the 323rd moved to Lessay airfield in France (A-20).

Postwar military use

In December 1944, the Airborne Forces Experimental Establishment (AFEE) moved to the airfield, where it remained for nearly six years using a variety of aircraft, including unusual ones such as the General Aircraft GAL.55 glider "Trixie" - the nickname bestowed from its Air Ministry Specification "TX.3/43", the Supermarine Type 322 "Dumbo", the Hafner Rotachute and Rotabuggy, and the Hamilcar X, along with various Handley Page Halifaxes used for supply-dropping experiments. The AFEE was involved in experimental work with glider towing and parachute drops, using the former East Boldre Airfield site on the far side of the Lymington-Beaulieu road as a drop zone.

On 14 September 1950, AFEE was disbanded, and most of its equipment and personnel were transferred to the Aeroplane and Armament Experimental Establishment at RAF Boscombe Down. Helicopter training functions were transferred to RAF Andover. Beaulieu airfield was then without any flying units, placed under Care and Maintenance status, and then declared inactive. On 1 April 1953 control passed once again to the United States Air Force, and the facility was upgraded, but in the event no further flying units arrived.

Finally, on 8 September 1955 Beaulieu airfield was handed back to the Air Ministry, in whose care it remained until November 1959 when it relinquished control of the land.

Current use

With the facility released from military control, it once again became part of the New Forest Crown lands managed by the Forestry Commission. Half a century on from its use as a military airfield, the vast majority of the concreted areas of the airfield have been removed and returned to heathland, although the former locations of the runways along with the perimeter track are all clearly identifiable in aerial photography.

The RAF Base Identification Code, Pundit Code letters BL can still be seen at this location 50°48'31.2"N 1°30'28.4"W. 

A small section of the eastern end of the 27/09 main runway near the Lymington road is still concreted and used as a runway, pit and pilot control area for model aircraft. The connecting length of the eastern perimeter road is used as a cycle track. No buildings around the airfield area exist although the old water tower still stands to the north west of the airfield on Roundhill campsite, a Forestry Commission site which uses part of the old access roads of the airfield. Small parts of the former airfield are now covered with conifers.

Model Flying

Model aircraft are flown on a regular basis on the airfield.  There are separate flying areas set aside for radio controlled flight and free flight. The flying club pays fees to the Forestry Commission each year, to allow them to use the last surviving piece of concrete runway area to the east of the airfield to fly radio controlled aircraft.

See also

List of former Royal Air Force stations

References

Citations

Bibliography
 Dorr, Robert F., and Thomas D. Jones (2008). Hell Hawks!: The Untold Story of the American Fliers Who Savaged Hitler's Wehrmacht. St. Paul, MN: Zenith Press. .

 Freeman, Roger A. (1994) UK Airfields of the Ninth: Then and Now 1994. After the Battle 
 Freeman, Roger A. (1996) The Ninth Air Force in Colour: UK and the Continent-World War Two. After the Battle 

 Maurer, Maurer (1983). Air Force Combat Units Of World War II. Maxwell AFB, Alabama: Office of Air Force History. .

Sturtivant, Ray and Hamlin, John (2007). RAF Flying Training and Support Units. Air-Britain. 
 USAAS-USAAC-USAAF-USAF Aircraft Serial Numbers--1908 to present
 British Automobile Association (AA), (1978), Complete Atlas of Britain, 

Airfields of the IX Fighter Command in the United Kingdom
Airfields of the 9th Bombardment Division in the United Kingdom
Royal Air Force stations in Hampshire
Military installations closed in 1959
Military airbases established in 1942
1942 establishments in England
1959 disestablishments in England